Tell en-Nasbeh, likely the biblical city of Mizpah in Benjamin, is a 3.2 hectare (8 acre) tell located on a low plateau  northwest of Jerusalem in the West Bank. The site lies adjacent to an ancient roadway connecting Jerusalem with the northern hill country, which is how Tell en-Nasbeh gained importance as Judah's northern border fortress during its prime phase of occupation in the Iron Age II (Strata 3A-C; 1000–586 BCE). There are also archaeological remains at the site and in surrounding cave tombs that have been dated to the Early Bronze I (Stratum 5; 3500–3300 BCE), Iron I (Stratum 4; 1200–1000 BCE), Babylonian and Persian (Stratum 2; 586–323 BCE), Hellenistic, Roman and Byzantine Periods (Stratum 1; 323 BCE – 630 CE).

Excavation history
The site was excavated over 5 seasons between 1926 and 1935 by William Frederic Badè of the Pacific School of Religion in Berkeley, CA. The project was jointly sponsored by the Pacific School of Religion (PSR) and the American Schools of Oriental Research (ASOR), and represents one of the earliest scientific excavations in region. After Badè's untimely death in 1936, his colleagues compiled and published a 2-volume final report for the excavation.

The original dig records, specifically the stratigraphic evidence, were later re-analyzed and published by Jeffrey R. Zorn of Cornell University. Research of the Tell en-Nasbeh collection continues today, both by staff of the Badè Museum of Biblical Archaeology at the Pacific School of Religion (formerly the Palestine Institute, then Badè Institute of Biblical Archaeology) and by outside scholars from around the world.

Museum staff are also involved in a huge multi-year project to digitize over 5,800 objects that comprise the Tell en-Nasbeh collection. This project, based in Open Context, is in collaboration with staff of the Alexandria Archive Institute in San Francisco, CA.

Occupational history
Tell en-Nasbeh was a small village in the Late Chalcolithic and Early Bronze I periods. It was then abandoned until the beginning of the Iron Age, around the 10th century BCE, when it became a sizable agricultural village. By Iron Age II (9th–8th centuries BCE), it was a walled settlement with a massive city gate, on the frontier between the southern and northern Israelite kingdoms.
During the Jewish-Babylonian War, the area to the north of Jerusalem yielded to the Babylonians without a battle, according to archaeological evidence and other indications in the Hebrew Bible. After the destruction of Jerusalem by Nebuchadnezzar II in 587/6 BCE, Mizpah became the administrative center for the district of Binyamin in Judah. According to a study done by Tel Aviv University, Tell en-Nasbeh survived the Babylonian campaign and rose to prominence in the sixth century BCE as the most important settlement nearby.Pottery, coins, and other small finds indicate Tell en-Nasbeh was still occupied by the Hellenistic Period when Judas Maccabeus gathered his army at Mizpah to confront the Seleucid army. Later finds, including a tower, tombs in the extramural cemeteries, and the floor of a Byzantine church near the western cemetery, speak to some occupation in later periods.

References

External links
Digitizing Tell en-Naṣbeh (Biblical Mizpah of Benjamin) collection

Ramallah and al-Bireh Governorate
Hebrew Bible cities
Iron Age sites in Asia
Archaeological sites in the West Bank
Tells (archaeology)